"Big Town" is a song by Scottish pop band The Big Dish, which was released in 1991 as the second single from their third and final studio album Satellites. The song was written by Steven Lindsay and produced by Warne Livesey.

For its release as a single, "Big Town" was remixed by Livesey and The Big Dish. East West considered the single to be one of their "priority releases" at the time. As the follow-up to the band's top 40 hit "Miss America", "Big Town" peaked at No. 94 in the UK Singles Chart and remained in the Top 100 for two weeks. It was the band's last entry in the UK Top 100.

Critical reception
On its release, Tim Peacock of Sounds praised "Big Town" as "a sure-fire hit pop choon", "the most brazenly obvious 45 choice" from Satellites and a track which "falls happily to the correct side of the scything stadium rock machine". He commented, "Pepped up by brass and lashings of girly harmonies, the chorus is smooth and confident, while Lindsay's voice attains control without ever beginning to strain". Music & Media wrote, "Growing bigger and bigger. Second single from their sophisticated, soulful pop album Satellites and follow-up to their recent hit 'Miss America'. Big Dish, Big Town, Big Hit..." Billy Sloan of the Daily Record commented that the song, as the follow-up to "Miss America", "sounds like another smash to me". In a review of Satellites, Dan Kening of the Chicago Tribune described the song as "hook-filled" and noted Lindsay's "crystalline lead vocals".

Track listing
7" single
"Big Town" (Remix) – 4:02
"Good Way" – 4:32

12" single
"Big Town" (Remix) – 4:02
"Good Way" – 4:32
"He Stumbled on Some Magic" – 3:51

CD single
"Big Town" (Remix) – 4:02
"Good Way" – 4:32
"He Stumbled on Some Magic" – 3:51
"Medicine Jar" – 3:15

CD single (US promo)
"Big Town" (Remix) – 4:01
"Big Town" (LP Version) – 4:05

Personnel
Big Town
 Steve Lindsay – vocals, guitar
 Brian McFie – guitar
 Craig Armstrong – keyboards, piano
 John Giblin – bass
 Jody Linscott – percussion
 Shirley Lewis, Carol Kenyon – backing vocals
 Warne Livesey – programming

Production
 Warne Livesey – producer of "Big Town", remix of "Big Town"
 The Big Dish – remix of "Big Town"
 Steven Lindsay – producer of "Good Way", "He Stumbled on Some Magic" and "Medicine Jar"
 Richard Moakes – engineer on "Big Town"
 Felix Kendall – mix engineer on "Big Town"

Other
 John Stoddart – photography

Charts

References

1991 songs
1991 singles
East West Records singles